Asura strigipennis is a moth of the family Erebidae. It was described by Gottlieb August Wilhelm Herrich-Schäffer in 1914. It is found on Java, Sumatra and in China (Shanghai, Zhejiang), Taiwan and India (Sikkim, Assam).

References

Moths described in 1914
strigipennis
Moths of Asia